The Chaprais or Chaprais is a district of Besançon, which was developed from the second half of the 19th century. Located in north-east of the historic center, it has 15,500 inhabitants which makes the second bigger area of the city

Etymology
Chaprais would be the contraction of "fields" and "meadows"

History
The first are Chaprais a hamlet vegetable that grows in the second half of the eighteenth. Over the next century, the area is urbanizing slowly and after the construction of the Besançon station at the north end of Chaprais. Its development is accelerated with the construction of the current bridge of the Republic. At the end of the 19th century, Chaprais are a dynamic that attracts modern industrial (automobile brand Schneider, for example), but the bourgeoisie Bisontine who built beautiful villas such as those of the rue de Vittel. This vitality is also Chaprais favorite neighborhood in the municipality built a second station called the Mouillère, and promotes the building of the complex of baths (balneotherapy building, hotel and casino). Despite these activities, the area retains its originality Chaprais particularly in his stand that until today, is marked by great social mix.

If the beginning of the 20th century was marked by a certain demographic stagnation after the Second World War the Chaprais found vigor. Several apartment buildings are constructed and the remaining garden are rejected in the district of Vaite.

Geography
The secor is located near the historical center of Besançon, Saint-Claude and Bregille.

Monuments
 Church of Saint-Martin
 Cemetery of Chaprais

Shops
 Seven bakeries
 Four butchers
 Four grocery stores
 A fish shop
 Seven restaurants and fast food
 Two stores in the articles of wines and beers
 Three bars and cafes
 Four florists
 Five clothing stores
 Two stores specializing in computers
 An Store Opticians
 A store specializing in the lighting section
 A tobacconist
 Seven pharmacies
 Seven posts or banks
 An Art Gallery

Radios
 BIP radio

Education

Transports
Lines of bus 1 - 3 - 4 - 5 - 6 - 7 - 8 - 10 - 20 - 24 - 27 - 32 - 34 serve the area

Associations
 Live in Chaprais (Associations)

See also
 Besançon
 Planoise

Sources
 French page about Chaprais

Chaprais